The Decision was a television special on ESPN in which National Basketball Association (NBA) player LeBron James announced that he would be signing with the Miami Heat instead of returning to his hometown team, the Cleveland Cavaliers. It was broadcast live on July 8, 2010. James was an unrestricted free agent after playing seven seasons in Cleveland, where he was a two-time NBA Most Valuable Player and a six-time All-Star. He grew up in nearby Akron, Ohio, where he received national attention as a high school basketball star.

Background 
James was born and raised in Akron, Ohio, where he received national attention as a high school basketball star at St. Vincent–St. Mary High School. He was drafted out of high school by his hometown Cleveland Cavaliers with the first overall pick of the 2003 NBA draft. He played the first seven seasons of his professional career in Cleveland, where he was a two-time NBA Most Valuable Player and a six-time NBA All-Star. James became an unrestricted free-agent at 12:01 am EDT (UTC-4) on July 1, 2010. He was courted by several teams, including the New York Knicks, Chicago Bulls, New Jersey Nets, Miami Heat, Los Angeles Clippers, and the Cavaliers.

The idea for the show originally came from Bill Simmons's mailbag column in November 2009 on ESPN, which published reader Drew Wagner's question, "What if LeBron announces he will pick his 2010-11 team live on ABC on a certain date for a show called 'LeBron's Choice?'" Wagner's idea was inspired by the trend of high school seniors being recruited announcing their college choice in a news conference. During NBA All-Star Weekend in 2010, Simmons pitched the idea to James's business partner, Maverick Carter; James's then-agent, Leon Rose; and James's advisor, William Wesley. After James and the Cavaliers lost to the Boston Celtics in the NBA playoffs in May, Simmons thought there was no way for the idea to proceed, and he was no longer involved.

During halftime of Game 2 of the NBA Finals in Los Angeles, Carter ran into freelance sportscaster Jim Gray and media agent Ari Emanuel, when Gray pitched the announcement show to Carter and Emanuel. Carter convinced James to do the show, and Emanuel pitched the idea to then-ESPN president John Skipper. Gray's idea was for an hour-long show in which James would announce his decision. Gray once worked for ESPN, and James' management team insisted that he be involved in the interview. ESPN gave away the airtime as barter syndication, allowing James' team to sell ads in exchange for the news story. NBA commissioner David Stern, believing that ESPN was giving too much control to James, tried to get the event cancelled.

Before the special aired Chris Broussard, who was one of the show's presenters, reported that James would join the Heat based on statements he had heard from multiple sources.

Announcement 
On July 8, 2010, ESPN aired a live special named The Decision that ran 75 minutes with commercials. At 9:28 p.m EDT, James announced that he would play with Miami in the 2010–11 season, teaming with the Heat's other All-Star free agent signees Dwyane Wade and Chris Bosh (who had joined from the Toronto Raptors).

The announcement, which was not made until nearly 30 minutes into the program, was part of a conversation between James and Gray. Broadcast from the Boys and Girls Club of Greenwich, Connecticut, the show raised $2.5 million for the charity. The show raised an additional $3.5 million from advertisement revenue which was donated to other various charities.

Wade had informed Heat President Pat Riley that James wanted to become less of a scorer and more of a distributor, and James looked forward to no longer carrying the offense night after night as he did playing with Cleveland. Riley sold to James that "LeBron would be Magic Johnson, Dwyane Wade would be Kobe Bryant, Chris would be Kevin Garnett". Relieved of the burden of scoring, James thought he could be the first player to average a triple-double in a season since Oscar Robertson.

The Cavaliers were informed of James' decision minutes before the show began.

Critical reception 
The television program drew high ratings, with Nielsen announcing that an average of 9.948 million people watched the show in the United States, with 13.1 million watching at the time of James' announcement. Cleveland topped all markets with a 26.0 Nielsen rating and 39 share. The show's Nielsen ratings were 6.1 in households, and 4.1 in 18-49, making it the most watched cable show of the night.

The show drew criticism for the prolonged wait until James' actual decision which was mostly filled in with panel discussions. (In addition in a call with Media critics the day before ESPN said the decision would have actually occurred in the first 10 to 15 minutes of the program.) Along with the spectacle of the show itself. The phrase "taking my talents to South Beach" became a punch line for critics.

In Cleveland, fans considered James' departure a betrayal that ranks second to The Move, Art Modell's relocation of the Cleveland Browns to Baltimore. Associated Press wrote that The Decision joined The Move, The Drive, The Shot, and The Fumble in "Cleveland's sports hall of shame". Almost immediately, Cleveland Cavaliers majority owner Dan Gilbert wrote an open letter to fans published in Comic Sans typeface on the Cavs website, denouncing James' decision as a "selfish", "heartless", "callous", and "cowardly betrayal", while guaranteeing that the Cavs would win an NBA title before the "self-declared former King". Gilbert's sports-memorabilia company Fathead also lowered the price of wall graphics depicting James from $99.99 to $17.41, the birth year of Benedict Arnold. William Rhoden of The New York Times defended James by stating that Gilbert's "venomous, face-saving personal attack", along with the ensuing "wrath of jersey-burning fans", only validated James' decision to leave Cleveland. Jesse Jackson, an American civil rights activist, said Gilbert's feelings "personify a slave master mentality", and he was treating James as "a runaway slave". Jackson added, "This is an owner employee relationship between business partners and LeBron honored his contract. J. A. Adande of ESPN said, however, that James chose to promote the drama of his decision in an hour-long television special instead of showing "common courtesy" to notify Cleveland and other teams of his plans. On July 12, 2010, Stern fined Gilbert $100,000 for the letter's contents, while also criticizing the way James handled free agency. On July 14, James told J. R. Moehringer for a GQ article that there was "nothing at all" he would change about his handling of free agency.

Former NBA players criticized his decision to not stay with Cleveland and continuing to try to win a championship as "the guy". Michael Jordan stated that he would not have contacted his rivals from other teams like Magic Johnson and Larry Bird to play on one team together, as "I wanted to defeat those guys". Jordan added that "... things are different [now]. I can't say that's a bad thing. It's an opportunity these kids have today". Johnson echoed Jordan's sentiments on teaming with rivals.

On September 29, 2010, when asked by Soledad O'Brien of CNN if race was a factor in the fallout from The Decision, James said, "I think so, at times. There's always – you know, a race factor". James had previously stayed clear of racial issues. When an earlier racial controversy over his cover on Vogue became a national debate, James had no comment. Two African American sports columnists criticized James for injecting race into the issue—Mike Freeman of CBSSports.com said James suddenly bringing up race in this instance was "laughable", and Jason Whitlock of Foxsports.com said James' usage of the race card was "an excuse to avoid dealing with his own bad Decision". Adande, also African American, had a different view, saying James "didn't claim to be a victim of racial persecution" and "caused us to examine the bias that's always lurking".

Aftermath 

Although other NBA superteams existed before 2010, the Heat with James was the first that players created. Before a game against the Nets on October 31, 2010, his first game against one of his suitors, James reflected on his free agency: "If I had to go back on it, I probably would do it a little bit different", James said. "But I'm happy with my decision." He declined to be more specific. Following The Decision, Forbes listed him as one of the world's most disliked athletes. James relented about the TV special before the 2011–12 season: "if the shoe was on the other foot and I was a fan, and I was very passionate about one player, and he decided to leave, I would be upset too about the way he handled it." James won two NBA championships with Miami: the first in 2011–12 in his second season with the Heat, and again the following season in 2012–13. By 2013, his image had mostly recovered and he was reported by ESPN as the most popular player in the NBA for the second time in his career.

The Cavaliers finished their 2010–11 season with a 19–63 record, including a then-NBA record 26-game losing streak. In the four NBA drafts after James' departure, the Cavaliers won the draft lottery three times to receive the first overall pick. Their 2011 first overall pick, Kyrie Irving, was named the 2012 NBA Rookie of the Year, and was also the MVP of both the All-Star Game and the FIBA Basketball World Cup in 2014.

When James announced his return to the Cavaliers for the 2014–15 season in a Sports Illustrated essay on July 11, 2014, he alluded to the controversy surrounding the special, saying "I'm not having a press conference or a party." He led Cleveland to an NBA championship in 2015–16, when the Cavaliers became the first team ever to rally from a 3–1 deficit to win an NBA Finals. It was the city's first major professional sports title in 52 years.

A poll by Davie-Brown Index after the special found that James's overall appeal dropped 11 percent, while his endorsement appeal dropped 2 percent, and trust in James dropped 3 percent. Another ESPN/ Seton Hall poll that was taken in October 2010 found that 51.6% of basketball fans said that James move to Miami didn't impact how they viewed him, with 32% of white fans and 65% of Black fans viewing James favorably.

In 2020, ESPN aired a documentary episode about the special titled "Backstory: The Decision"

See also 
 Cleveland sports curse
 Cleveland Browns relocation controversy
 The Shot

References

External links

ESPN documentary to explore LeBron James' "Decision" — The Denver Post

2010s American television specials
2010 in American television
2010 television specials
2010–11 NBA season
Cleveland Cavaliers
ESPN original programming
LeBron James
Miami Heat
National Basketball Association on television
July 2010 events in the United States
National Basketball Association controversies